22nd (County of London) Battalion (The Queen’s) was a battalion of the London Regiment (1908-1938). Between 1908 and 1938 its drill hall was at 2 Jamaica Road in Bermondsey, south London.

Its origins lay in the 10th and 23rd Surrey Rifle Volunteers, founded in 1859. Those two units merged to form the 6th Surrey Rifle Volunteer Corps in 1880, which three years later was assigned to the Queen's Royal Regiment (West Surrey) as the latter's 3rd (Volunteer) Battalion. When the Territorial Force was formed in 1908, the battalion was reassigned to the new London Regiment, with whom it remained until 1937, when it returned to the Queen's Royal Regiment (West Surrey), now as that regiment's 6th (Bermondsey) Battalion. Unveiled in 1921, its First World War memorial on Old Jamaica Road in Bermondsey was Grade II listed in 2010.

References 

22nd